Alburnoides diclensis is a species of cyprinid fish that lives in the Tigris River, Anatolia, Turkey.

References

Alburnoides
Freshwater fish of Turkey
Endemic fauna of Turkey
Fish described in 2016